Eumorsea pinaleno is a species of grasshopper in the family Eumastacidae. It is endemic to the Arizona in the United States, where it is likely restricted to the Pinaleno Mountains. It is known commonly as the Pinaleno monkey grasshopper.

This grasshopper has an elongated body 8 to 24 millimeters long and long legs. It has no wings. Little is known about the biology of the species.

References

Eumastacidae
Endemic fauna of Arizona
Insects of the United States
~
Insects described in 1959
Taxonomy articles created by Polbot